The fourth plinth is the northwest plinth in Trafalgar Square in central London. It was originally intended to hold an equestrian statue of William IV, but remained bare due to insufficient funds. For over 150 years the fate of the plinth was debated; in 1998, the Royal Society for the encouragement of Arts, Manufactures and Commerce (RSA) commissioned three contemporary sculptures to be displayed temporarily on the plinth. Shortly afterwards, Chris Smith, Secretary of State for Culture, Media and Sport, commissioned Sir John Mortimer to seek opinions from public art commissioners, critics and members of the public as to the future of the plinth.

Mortimer's final report recommended that the commissions remain a rolling programme of temporary artworks rather than settle permanently on one figure or idea to commemorate. In 2003, the ownership of Trafalgar Square was transferred from Westminster City Council to the Mayor of London and this marked the beginning of the Mayor of London's Fourth Plinth Commission as it is now known.

The plinths
There is a plinth at each of the four corners of the square. The two southern plinths carry sculptures of Henry Havelock and Charles James Napier. The northern plinths are larger than those in the southern corners, as they were designed to have equestrian statues, and indeed the northeastern plinth has one of George IV. The fourth plinth on the northwest corner, designed by Sir Charles Barry and built in 1841, was intended to hold an equestrian statue of William IV but remained empty due to insufficient funds.

The Fourth Plinth Project (1999–2001)
In 1998, the RSA conceived the Fourth Plinth Project, which temporarily occupied the plinth with a succession of works commissioned and established by the Cass Sculpture Foundation. These were:

A committee convened to consider the RSA's late-1990s project concluded that it had been a success and "unanimously recommended that the plinth should continue to be used for an ongoing series of temporary works of art commissioned from leading national and international artists". After several years in which the plinth stood empty, the new Greater London Authority assumed responsibility for Trafalgar Square and the fourth plinth.

The Fourth Plinth Commission (2005–present)
The Fourth Plinth Commission is led by the Mayor of London's Culture Team, under the guidance of the Fourth Plinth Commissioning Group. The group is made up of specialist advisers appointed to guide and monitor the commissions for the plinth.

Under the stewardship of the Fourth Plinth Commissioning Group, the following artworks have been commissioned:

Proposals for permanent statues

The best use of the fourth plinth remains the subject of debate and discussion. Proposals for permanent statues have included:

 Nelson Mandela Statue: On 24 March 2003, an appeal was launched by Wendy Woods, the widow of the anti-apartheid journalist Donald Woods, hoping to raise £400,000 to pay for a  statue of Nelson Mandela by Ian Walters. The relevance of the location was that South Africa House, the South African high commission, scene of many anti-apartheid demonstrations, is on the east side of Trafalgar Square. The statue was later placed in Parliament Square instead.
 Keith Park statue: In February 2008, Terry Smith, the chief executive of trading house Tullett Prebon, offered to pay more than £100,000 for a permanent statue acceptable to "ordinary Londoners" of Air Chief Marshal Sir Keith Park in recognition of his work as commander of No. 11 Group RAF during the Battle of Britain, as it was this Group that was responsible for the defence of London. A Greater London Authority spokesman said: "There are many worthy suggestions for statues on the fourth plinth and some people feel passionately about each of them. All proposals will be judged on their merits including its current use as one of the most high profile sites for contemporary public art in London. The cost of erecting the current work on the plinth is £270,000. The cost of a permanent monument is likely to be considerably more." In 2009, a 5-metre high fibreglass statue of Park was placed on the fourth plinth for six months. After that period, a 2.78-metre bronze statue was permanently installed in Waterloo Place.
 Margaret Thatcher statue: Following the death of former Prime Minister Margaret Thatcher, Baroness Thatcher on 8 April 2013, Defence Secretary Philip Hammond suggested that her memorial statue be placed on the fourth plinth. Hammond's proposal was supported by Thatcher's colleague Norman Tebbit and by UKIP leader Nigel Farage. The then Prime Minister David Cameron and London Mayor Boris Johnson were both said to welcome the proposal. Johnson proposed Parliament Square as a more appropriate site. There is already an existing statue of Thatcher in the nearby Houses of Parliament.
 Queen Elizabeth II statue: It has also been suggested over several years that a permanent statue of Queen Elizabeth II might be erected on the plinth following her death, which would explain why there has been such a long delay in choosing a permanent monument. This proposal was discussed in the press in 2008. After Thatcher's death in 2013, Ken Livingstone commented, "The understanding is that the fourth plinth is being reserved for Queen Elizabeth II." On Queen Elizabeth's death in 2022, MPs expressed their support for the idea of the fourth plinth being used for a statue of her.
 Captain Sir Tom Moore statue: Following Moore's death on 2 February 2021, TV presenter Nick Knowles suggested that a statue of Moore should be placed permanently on the fourth plinth, in recognition of Moore's fundraising efforts in the run up to his 100th birthday during the COVID-19 pandemic.

Other uses
Commercial companies have used the plinth, usually without permission, as a platform for publicity stunts, including a model of David Beckham by Madame Tussauds during the 2002 FIFA World Cup. The London-based American harmonica player Larry Adler jokingly suggested erecting a statue of Moby-Dick, which would then be called the "Plinth of Whales". A television ident for the British TV station Channel 4 shows a CGI Channel 4 logo on top of the fourth plinth.

Fourth Plinth Schools Awards
The annual Fourth Plinth Schools Award is the education project within the Mayor of London's Fourth Plinth Programme. The award uses the Fourth Plinth as an inspiration to engage primary and secondary schools in London to enter a competition that encourages creative thinking around past and present artworks displayed on the Fourth Plinth.

In popular culture
In Sir Arthur Conan Doyle's 1912 novel, The Lost World, the narrator speculates that Professor Challenger "in his fancy, may ... see himself sometimes, gracing the vacant pedestal in Trafalgar Square".

References

External links

 
 "Fourth Plinth", Greater London Authority website
 Sir Keith Park Memorial Campaign – proposal to erect a statue in honour of the Battle of Britain war hero Air Chief Marshal Sir Keith Park

Public art in London
4th plinth, Trafalgar Square